During the 2014–15 season, FC Dnipro Dnipropetrovsk competed in the Ukrainian Premier League.

Season summary
Dnipro reached the Europa League final, only to be defeated by a Sevilla side in the middle of three consecutive Europa League wins.

Players

First-team squad
Squad at end of season

Left club during season

References

Notes

FC Dnipro seasons
Dnipro